Richard James Overy  (born 23 December 1947) is a British historian who has published on the history of World War II and Nazi Germany. In 2007, as The Times editor of Complete History of the World, he chose the 50 key dates of world history.

Life and career
Overy, after being educated at Caius College, Cambridge, and becoming a research fellow at Churchill College, taught history at Cambridge from 1972 to 1979, as a fellow of Queens' College and from 1976 as a university assistant lecturer. He moved to King's College London, where he became professor of modern history in 1994. He was appointed to a professorship at the University of Exeter in 2004.

Overy's work on the Second World War has been praised as "highly effective [in] the ruthless dispelling of myths" (AJP Taylor), "original and important" (New York Review of Books) and "at the cutting edge" (Times Literary Supplement).

Dispute with Timothy Mason

In the late 1980s, Overy was involved in a historical dispute with Timothy Mason that mostly played out over the pages of Past & Present over the reasons for the outbreak of the Second World War in 1939. Mason had contended that a "flight into war" had been imposed on Adolf Hitler by a structural economic crisis, which confronted Hitler with the choice of making difficult economic decisions or aggression. Overy argued against Mason's thesis by maintaining that though Germany was faced with economic problems in 1939, their extent cannot explain aggression against Poland and the outbreak of war was caused by the Nazi leadership. For Overy, the problem with Mason's thesis was that it rested on assumptions that were not shown by records, information that was passed on to Hitler about Germany's economic problems.

Overy argued that there was a difference between economic pressures induced by the problems of the Four Year Plan and economic motives to seize raw materials, industry and foreign reserves of neighbouring states as a way of accelerating the Four Year Plan. Overy asserted that the repressive capacity of the German state as a way of dealing with domestic unhappiness was somewhat downplayed by Mason. Finally, Overy argued that there is considerable evidence that Germany felt that it could master the economic problems of rearmament; as one civil servant put it in January 1940, "we have already mastered so many difficulties in the past, that here too, if one or other raw material became extremely scarce, ways and means will always yet be found to get out of a fix".

Awards and honours
1977 Fellow of the Royal Historical Society
2000 Fellow of the British Academy
2003 Fellow of King's College
2001 Samuel Eliot Morison Prize of the Society for Military History
2004 Wolfson History Prize, The Dictators: Hitler's Germany; Stalin's Russia
2005 Hessell-Tiltman Prize, The Dictators: Hitler's Germany, Stalin's Russia

In media
Overy was featured in the 2006 BBC docudrama Nuremberg: Nazis on Trial.
KGNU's Claudia Cragg – interview with Overy on 'Countdown To War' for Remembrance Day (Veteran's Day) 2010.
Overy was a featured commentator in the 2018 series Hitler's Circle of Evil.

Publications
 William Morris, Viscount Nuffield (1976), .
 The Air War: 1939–1945 (1980), .
 The Nazi Economic Recovery, 1932–1938 (1982), .
 Goering: The "Iron Man" (1984), .
 All Our Working Lives (with Peter Pagnamenta, 1984), .
 The Origins of The Second World War edited by Patrick Finney, Edward Arnold: London, Hodder Education Publishers (1997), Third Edition (2008) .
 Co-written with Timothy Mason: "Debate: Germany, 'Domestic Crisis' and War in 1939" pp. 200–240 in Past and Present, Number 122, February 1989, reprinted as "Debate: Germany, 'Domestic Crisis' and the War in 1939" in The Origins of The Second World War (1997).
 The Road to War (with Andrew Wheatcroft, 1989), .
 The Inter-War Crisis, 1919–1939 (1994), .
 War and Economy in the Third Reich (1994), .
 Why the Allies Won (1995), .
 The Penguin Historical Atlas of the Third Reich (1996), .
 The Times Atlas of the Twentieth Century (ed., 1996), .
 Bomber Command, 1939–45 (1997), .
 Russia's War: Blood upon the Snow (1997), .
 The Times History of the 20th Century (1999), .
 The Battle (2000),  (republished as The Battle of Britain: The Myth and the Reality).
 Interrogations: The Nazi Elite in Allied Hands, 1945 (2001),  (republished as Interrogations: Inside the Minds of the Nazi Elite).
 Germany: A New Social and Economic History. Vol. 3: Since 1800 (ed. with Sheilagh Ogilvie, 2003), .
 The Times Complete History of the World (6th ed., 2004), .
 The Dictators: Hitler's Germany and Stalin's Russia (2004), .
 Collins Atlas of Twentieth Century History (2005), .
 Imperial War Museum's Second World War Experience Volume 1: Blitzkrieg (2008), .
 Imperial War Museum's Second World War Experience Volume 2: Axis Ascendant (2008), .
 1939: Countdown to War (2009), .
 The Morbid Age: Britain Between the Wars (2009), .
 The Bombing War: Europe 1939–1945 (2013),  (later published as The Bombers and the Bombed: Allied Air War Over Europe, 1940–1945).
 RAF: The Birth of the World's First Air Force (2018), 
 Blood and Ruins: The Great Imperial War, 1931–1945 (2021),

References

External links

 The British Academy, profile
 Official register of fellows of Queens' College, Cambridge
 Biography of Richard Overy, University of Exeter
 Google Scholar List of publications by Overy
 

1947 births
Living people
Academics of King's College London
Academics of the University of Exeter
Alumni of Gonville and Caius College, Cambridge
British military historians
British military writers
Fellows of Churchill College, Cambridge
Fellows of King's College London
Fellows of Queens' College, Cambridge
Fellows of the British Academy
Fellows of the Royal Historical Society
Historians of fascism
Historians of Nazism
Historians of World War II